In the Jailhouse Now is an album by Willie Nelson and Webb Pierce that was released in 1982 on the Columbia label (PC 38095). AllMusic gave the album four-and-a-half stars.  Critic Eugene Chadbourne praised the combination of different vocal styles: "Emotion is where the two really come together; they mean every word they say, and they put the lyrics across with the sentimental and meaningful spirit that is the essence of all great country & western."

Track listing
Side A
 "There Stands the Glass" (Autry Greisham, Russ Hull, Mary Jean Shurtz) [2:20]
 "Wondering" (Joe Werner) [3:33]
 "In the Jailhouse Now" (Jimmie Rodgers) [2:08]
 "You're Not Mine Anymore" (Webb Pierce, Teddy Wilburn) [2:17]
 "Heebie Jeebie Blues No. 2 (Willie Nelson, Webb Pierce, Max Powell) [2:49]

Side B
 "Slowly" (Tommy Hill, Webb Pierce) [2:25]
 "I Don't Care" (Webb Pierce, Cindy Walker) [2:14]
 "Back Street Affair" (Billy Wallace, Jimmy Rule) [2:45]
 "Let Me Be the First to Know" (Doyle Wilburn) [2:39]
 "More and More" (Merle Kilgore, Webb Pierce) [2:09]

References

1982 albums
Webb Pierce albums